The International Association of Refrigerated Warehouses (IARW) was founded in 1891, when a group of conventional warehouse men took on the demands of storing perishable food only to soon realize the challenge and complexity of operating temperature controlled storage facilities.

IARW's goals and activities have broadened considerably over the years. Today, in addition to collecting information and encouraging the exchange of ideas; the association aggressively promotes more efficient distribution services, aids members in adopting new technology, advises members of legislation and regulations affecting the food industry, assists members in complying with U.S. and international regulations, and participates in alliances with industry and international organizations having a common interest in the safe and efficient flow of food products around the world. All active members of IARW are also members and beneficiaries of the work of The World Food Logistics Organization (WFLO).

Global Cold Chain Alliance

The Global Cold Chain Alliance officially launched in April 2007. The Alliance now acts as the platform for communication, networking and education for each link of the cold chain. It serves as the focused voice of the cold chain industry.

The International Association of Refrigerated Warehouses (IARW) and the World Food Logistics Organization (WFLO) have an impressive history of serving the food industry through the twentieth century and the impressive development of refrigeration in the movement of food products.

Moving towards and into the 21st century, many of these organizations’ members had found a need to adapt business models in response to an acceleration of changing global conditions. This response represented an increased integration of the cold chain industry. This had, in turn, initiated closer relationships among all players in the supply chain. Developments such as dedicated distribution facilities and public refrigerated warehouse (PRW) investment in trucking assets bore witness to this trend.

International Refrigerated Transportation Association(IRTA)
IRTA is an international, non-profit organization established in 1994 to meet a growing demand in the transportation industry for chilled and frozen food products. IRTA has a core international membership of companies involved in the refrigerated transportation industry that primarily includes: Ports, Trucking, Warehousing/Logistics, Marine Shipping, Rail, and Air.

Top 25 Members in North America

References

 Profile of International Association of Refrigerated Warehouses
 Tienda Oficial de Refrigeradores

External links
 International Association of Refrigerated Warehouses - Official website

International trade associations
Cooling technology